João de María (born 12 May 1896, date of death unknown), known as De María, was a Brazilian footballer. He played in two matches for the Brazil national football team in 1920. He was also part of Brazil's squad for the 1920 South American Championship.

References

External links
 

1896 births
Year of death missing
Brazilian footballers
Brazil international footballers
Footballers from Rio de Janeiro (city)
Association football defenders
São Cristóvão de Futebol e Regatas players